The Black Mountain College Museum + Arts Center (BMCM+AC) is an exhibition and performance space and resource center located at 120 College Street on Pack Square Park in downtown Asheville, North Carolina dedicated to preserving and continuing the legacy of educational and artistic innovations of Black Mountain College (BMC). BMCM+AC achieves its mission through collection, conservation, and educational activities including exhibitions, publications and public programs.

History
Arts advocate Mary Holden Thompson founded BMCM+AC in 1993 to celebrate the history of Black Mountain College as a forerunner in progressive interdisciplinary education and to explore its extraordinary impact on modern and contemporary art, dance, theater, music, and performance. Today, the museum remains committed to educating the public about BMC's history and raising awareness of its extensive legacy. BMCM+AC's goal is to provide a gathering point for people from a variety of backgrounds to interact through art, ideas, and discourse.

Location 
BMCM+AC was first based out of founder Mary Holden Thompson's house in Black Mountain, NC. From 2003 to 2018, BMCM+AC was housed in a storefront gallery at 56 Broadway. In September 2018, BMCM+AC opened a new space at 120 College Street, a relocation and expansion to a newly renovated building on Pack Square Park in the heart of the city. The new 6,000 square foot space doubled the museum's footprint and includes 2,500 square feet of flexible exhibition/event space with a seating capacity for 180, a permanent Black Mountain College history and research center, an expanded library and education center with over 1,500 BMC-related texts, and on-site storage for the museum's permanent collection and research center.

Timeline 

1993 – Founding of the Black Mountain College Museum + Arts Center
1995 – A Black Mountain College reunion is organized and attended by over 100 alumni.
1997 – BMCM+AC launches an ongoing oral history program dedicated to documenting Black Mountain College alumni.
2002 – A regional festival called Under the Influence takes place, exploring the legacy of Black Mountain College through music, education and performance.
2003 – BMCM+AC opens a permanent museum gallery space in downtown Asheville at 56 Broadway Street.
2009 – The first annual international ReVIEWING Black Mountain College conference is held, organized in partnership with the University of North Carolina at Asheville (UNCA).
2010 – The first annual {Re}HAPPENING is held, an experimental art event featuring over 100 artists held on the former grounds of Black Mountain College.
2010 – A partnership is established with UNCA to provide digitization and archival storage for the growing BMCM+AC archives.
2011 – An NEH Landmarks of American History and Culture grant is awarded.
2011 – A new online publication, the Journal of Black Mountain College Studies, is created.
2012 – The state of North Carolina moves Black Mountain College records to the Western Regional Archives in Oteen, NC, which further establishes Asheville as a center for BMC studies and strengthens BMCM+AC's partnership with the Archives.
2013 – The 80th anniversary of BMC's founding, and the 20th anniversary of BMCM+AC's founding.
2015 – The newly redesigned and renovated 56 Broadway gallery space has its grand reopening.
2016 – NEA awards BMCM+AC an Art Works grant for Between Form and Content: Perspectives on Jacob Lawrence and Black Mountain College.
2017 – BMCM+AC Performance Initiative and Active Archive programs begin.
2018 – BMCM+AC relocates to a new, permanent home at 120 College Street.

Exhibitions
Pieces from the permanent collection, as well as loaned works, are featured via a rotating schedule of temporary exhibitions, which are on display for an average of four months at time. Exhibitions display the many histories of Black Mountain College through shared themes or the work of singular alumni. Exhibitions are often connected to contemporary legacies of BMC through programming or complimentary installations.

BMCM+AC has also co-curated exhibitions with a variety of regional institutions, including the Hickory Museum of Art, Western Carolina University, Folk Art Center, the Western Regional Archives, and the Smith-McDowell House.

Collections

BMCM+AC Permanent Collection
The BMCM+AC permanent collection includes items with dates of creation ranging from 1931 to 2004. All items in the collection have a direct connection to the history of BMC, such as original college publications and other primary source materials. Components of the collection are photographs, ephemera, paintings, drawings/prints, poems/books/monographs/magazines/articles, writings/correspondences. The museum owns a variety of objects, including ceramics/clay, furniture/wood, sculptures, weavings/fiber, collages and mixed media pieces, broadsides/artists’ books and music/album covers.

In addition, the collection features a full set of the poetry journal The Black Mountain Review, which formed the group of writers known as the Black Mountain Poets. In Summer 2013, the museum acquired a 1971 work by BMC alumnus Robert Rauschenberg, Opal Gospel, 10 American Indian Poems, consisting of 10 moveable silkscreened acrylic panels of American Indian stories and imagery. Other noted pieces in the collection are furniture from the original Black Mountain College campuses: two benches from the Quiet House, a place for contemplation, meditation, and observance of special occasions at the Lake Eden campus and a desk designed by Josef Albers. BMCM+AC has an original Black Mountain College directional sign from the Lake Eden Campus, which is displayed in the museum library. The collection features many other works by various alumni, faculty and key figures of Black Mountain College including, among many others, Ruth Asawa, Ray Johnson, Kenneth Noland, Charles Olson, M. C. Richards, Dorothea Rockburne, Suzi Gablik and Susan Weil. The museum also manages image requests on behalf of the Hazel Larsen Archer Estate. Hazel Larsen Archer was the first full-time instructor of photography at Black Mountain College, and her photographs are among the most well-known documentation of the people and daily activities of the college.

BMCM+AC has been facilitating oral history documentation since 1999, resulting in a collection of recorded interviews with 69 BMC alumni as of 2019. BMCM+AC also has a research library, which includes approximately 400 BMC-related resources in audio, video and book form. These resources, in addition to the aforementioned oral histories, are available to museum visitors and members as a part the museum's publicly accessible resource center.

In addition to the museum's regional use of the collection in exhibitions, the collection is also accessed nationally and internationally by means of traveling exhibitions and loans to other institutions. Works from BMCM+AC's permanent collection have been loaned to the exhibitions Leap Before You Look: Black Mountain College (Institute of Contemporary Art, Boston Wexner Center for the Arts and Hammer Museum), Robert Rauschenberg: Among Friends at the Museum of Modern Art, Black Mountain College and Interdisciplinary Experiment 1933 - 1957 at Hamburger Bahnhof in Berlin, among others.

The Jargon Society
In 2012, BMCM+AC was chosen as the receiving institution for the remaining publications and archive of The Jargon Society, a small press publisher founded in 1951 by Jonathan Williams. The archive currently includes over 70 titles out of the total 115 Jargon titles. Of the 115 originals in the Jargon catalogue, approximately 85 are books and another 30 are broadsides, pamphlets and other publications. The museum has continued publication under the imprint. The most recent Jargon title as of 2019 is The Black Mountain College Anthology of Poetry, produced in collaboration with the University of North Carolina Press.

Programs

{Re}HAPPENING
The {Re}HAPPENING, an annual multidisciplinary art event, honors the interdisciplinary nature of Black Mountain College and pays tribute to the innovations of that community of artists. Hosted on the former BMC campus at Lake Eden, NC, the site-specific event launches a contemporary platform for artists and attendees to experience creativity in the present day.

Taking its name from what is widely considered to be the first ‘Happening’ in the United States—from John Cage’s emphasis on chance and the observer as vital components in artistic creation—the {Re}HAPPENING reimagines BMC's tradition of Saturday night parties and performances. Cage's proto-Happening took place at BMC in 1952 and featured Cage reading Meister Eckhart, Charles Olson and M.C. Richards reciting poetry, Robert Rauschenberg showing his White Paintings and playing recordings on an old victrola, and Merce Cunningham dancing.

Each year, the {Re}HAPPENING features over 80 local, regional, national, and international artists collaborating on 30+ visual art installations, new media presentations, and performances dependent upon wildly innovative visual and participatory components. As with Cage's 1952 event, the {Re}HAPPENING is a democratizing art experience, participatory and interactive rather than hierarchical.

Annual conference
The ReVIEWING Black Mountain College Conference is annual academic event which engages a variety of humanities disciplines. Hosted on the campus of UNC Asheville, the conferences of the past have included film screenings, musical and dramatic productions, hands-on workshops and lectures by new and established scholars.

Performance Initiative
Starting in fall 2017 with support from the Andrew W. Mellon Foundation’s HESH Program, BMCM+AC has worked to bring international artists to the region, with an emphasis on how art can strengthen community and deepen conversations around social justice. This work extends the legacy of Black Mountain College, which brought international artists previously unknown in the region to interact with the culture and practices of Western North Carolina. The stream of programs began in September 2017 with the Southeast premiere of Black Mountain Songs, an expansive choral and visual celebration of Black Mountain College performed by the Brooklyn Youth Chorus and curated by Bryce Dessner and Richard Reed Parry. Other projects have included choreographer Silvana Cardell’s Supper, People on the Move, a dance performance inspired by themes of migration and the complex experience of dislocation. This performance was accompanied by an exhibition of photographs and narratives telling the story of “People on the Move” in the Western North Carolina community. This initiative continued in the spring with the Southeast premiere of Dance Heginbotham and Maira Kalman’s The Principles of Uncertainty, an evening-length dance-theater work by choreographer John Heginbotham and author/illustrator Maira Kalman.

Active Archive 
In 2017, BMCM+AC launched an initiative called Active Archive, a stream of programs that pairs the museum's collection with contemporary artists, curators, and cultural thinkers. Components of the initiative include an artist's residency program and commissions of new work. The first artist resident was interdisciplinary artist Martha McDonald, whose output as part of Active Archive included a curated exhibition and catalogue, as well as community programs such as a performance, conference presentation, and gallery talks.

Publications
The BMCM+AC has published numerous dossiers, exhibition catalogues and books about Black Mountain College, its teachers, and alumni.

Journal of Black Mountain College Studies
Black Mountain College Studies is an online peer-reviewed publication of the Black Mountain College Museum + Arts Center. Submissions are accepted on a rolling basis.

Exhibition catalogues

 M.C. Richards, Centering: 100 Years, Life + Art
 Begin to See: The Photographers of Black Mountain College
 Zola Marcus: Kinetic Origins
 Randy Shull/Wide Open: Architecture + Design at BMCM+AC
 Ray Spillenger: Rediscovery of a Black Mountain Painter
 Convergence/Divergence: Exploring Black Mountain College + Chicago’s New Bauhaus/Institute of Design
 Dan Rice at Black Mountain College: Painter Among the Poets
 Black Mountain College: Shaping Craft + Design
 John Urbain: No Ideas But Things
 In Site: Late Works by Irwin Kremen
 Pat Passlof: Selections 1948-2011
 From BMC to NYC: The Tutelary Years of Ray Johnson
 Dorothea Rockburne: Astronomy Drawings
 Emerson Woelffer: At the Center + At the Edge
 Hazel Larsen Archer: Black Mountain College Photographer. Essays by David Vaughan, Connie Bostic, and Erika Zarow
ACTIVE ARCHIVE: Martha McDonald
Between Form and Content: Perspectives on Jacob Lawrence and Black Mountain College
VanDerBeek + VanDerBeek

Books
Basil King: Between Painting and Writing. Poetry chapbook by Basil King, 2016
Backpacking in the Hereafter. Poetry chapbook by M.C. Richards. Edited by Julia Connor, 2014
Cynthia Homire: Vision Quest. Black Mountain College Museum + Arts Center, 2014
Black Mountain Days. Michael Rumaker, Black Mountain College Museum + Arts Center, 2003
Remembering Black Mountain College. Mary Emma Harris, Black Mountain College Museum + Arts Center, 1995

Dossiers
The Dossiers focus on specific BMC alumni and serve both as exhibition catalogues and critical studies.
The museum has published dossiers featuring BMC alumni including Joseph Fiore, Fannie Hillsmith, Lore Kadden Lindenfeld, Ray Johnson, Susan Weil, Michael Rumaker, Gwendolyn Knight and Gregory Masurovsky.

References

External links
 BMCM+AC website
 BMCM+AC library catalog
BMCM+AC bookstore
 Journal of Black Mountain College Studies
 {Re}HAPPENING
 ReVIEWING Black Mountain College Annual Conference

Museums in Asheville, North Carolina
Arts centers in North Carolina
Art museums and galleries in North Carolina
Art museums established in 1993
1993 establishments in North Carolina